The Church of St Mary the Virgin  is a Scottish Episcopal Church, in Arbroath, Angus, Scotland. It is part of the Diocese of Brechin.

Church building
The church building in Springfield Terrace was erected in 1852–54 to the designs of John Henderson of Edinburgh. Robert Lorimer contributed the chancel screen and panelling in 1927.

The church has a large oblong nave and north aisle with chancel and side chapel. The  tower with lucarned spire is at the north-west of the nave and the spire is a prominent landmark on the skyline of the town. The materials are snecked masonry and slate. It was listed as Category B in 1971. The rectory, also by Henderson, is separately listed as Category C.

The organ is by Blackett & Howden of Newcastle upon Tyne.

History of the congregation
The Episcopalians were driven out of Arbroath parish church in 1694 and met in a series of meeting houses in the town. A Qualified congregation was formed about 1760. After the Episcopal and Qualified congregations joined in 1806 they worshipped in the former Qualified chapel, St Mary's which was sold in 1859 after the present church was built. The St Ninian's United Free Church (now disused) stands on the site of the earlier St Mary's.

Records
Church records for St Mary's are at University of Dundee Archives among the Brechin Diocesan Library Manuscripts.

See also
St Andrew's Parish Church, Arbroath (Church of Scotland)
St John's Methodist Church, Arbroath

References

External links
 The church's website
 Scottish Church Heritage Research

Churches in Angus, Scotland
Category B listed buildings in Angus, Scotland
Listed churches in Scotland
19th-century churches in the United Kingdom
Episcopal church buildings in Scotland
Arbroath